The Maccrady Formation is a geologic formation in West Virginia. It preserves fossils dating back to the Carboniferous period.

See also

 List of fossiliferous stratigraphic units in West Virginia

References

 

Carboniferous West Virginia
Carboniferous geology of Virginia
Tournaisian
Viséan